The  was an infantry division in the Imperial Japanese Army.

History
The 25th Division was formed in Tonei (東寧), present day Mudanjiang, Manchukuo on 10 July 1940, out of two pre-existing infantry regiments and a number of miscellaneous units and placed under the 5th Army of the Kwantung Army as part of the final defenses of Manchukuo against the Soviet army.

In March 1945, it was withdrawn to Japan, and assigned to Kobayashi, Miyazaki as part of the final defense of the Japanese home islands against the projected American invasion (Operation Downfall). Overall, the 25th division has never seen any combat.

See also
 List of Japanese Infantry Divisions

Reference and further reading

 Madej, W. Victor. Japanese Armed Forces Order of Battle, 1937-1945 [2 vols] Allentown, PA: 1981
 This article incorporates material from the Japanese Wikipedia page 第25師団 (日本軍), accessed 8 March 2016.

Japanese World War II divisions
Infantry divisions of Japan
Military units and formations established in 1940
Military units and formations disestablished in 1945
1940 establishments in Japan
1945 disestablishments in Japan